This list of the Cenozoic life of Arkansas contains the various prehistoric life-forms whose fossilized remains have been reported from within the US state of Arkansas and are between 66 million and 10,000 years of age.

A

 †Abdounia
 †Abdounia enniskilleni
 †Acrometa
 Acteon
 †Acteon idoneus
 Agaronia
 †Agaronia media
 Antalis
 †Antalis vincense
  Architectonica
 †Architectonica bellistriata
 Arius – or unidentified comparable form
 Astrangia
 †Astrangia harrisi – type locality for species
  Athleta
 †Athleta symmetricus

B

 Barbatia
 †Barbatia corvamnis
  †Basilosaurus
 †Basilosaurus cetoides
 Bathytormus
 †Bathytormus clarkensis
 †Bathytormus flexurus
 Blarina
 †Blarina brevicauda
 †Bootherium
  †Bootherium bombifrons
 Brachidontes
 †Brachidontes hamatoides
 †Brachyprotoma
 †Brachyprotoma obtusata
 Bullia
 †Bullia altilis

C

 Caestocorbula
 †Caestocorbula wailesiana
 †Calorhadia
 †Calorhadia reginajacksonis
 †Calyptraphorus
 †Calyptraphorus stamineus
 Canis
  †Canis armbrusteri
 †Canis latrans
 Carcharhinus
 †Carcharhinus gibbesi
 Carcharias
 †Carcharias hopei
 †Caricella
 †Caricella subangulata
 Caryocorbula
 †Caryocorbula densata
 †Caryocorbula willistoni
 Castor
 †Castor canadensis
  Cervus
 Chlamys
 †Chlamys corvina
 Clavilithes
 †Clavilithes humerosus
 Coluber
 †Coluber constrictor – or unidentified comparable form
 Conomitra
 †Conomitra hammakeri
 †Conomitra jacksonensis
 Conopeum
 †Conopeum damicornis
 Conus
 †Conus sauridens
  Corbula
 †Corbula subcompressa
 †Cornulina
 †Cornulina dalli
 †Coronia
 †Coronia childreni
 Crassostrea
 †Crassostrea alabamensis
  Crotalus
 Cytherea – report made of unidentified related form or using admittedly obsolete nomenclature

D

  Dasyatis
 Dentalium
 †Diaphyodus
 †Diaphyodus wilsoni
 †Diplobunops – or unidentified comparable form
 †Diplobunops matthewi
 Diplodonta
 †Diplodonta bulla

E

 †Eocenidris – type locality for genus
 †Eocenidris crassa – type locality for species
 †Eopleurotoma – tentative report
 †Eopleurotoma albirupsis
  Epitonium
 Eptesicus
 †Eptesicus fuscus
 Equus
  †Equus scotti – tentative report
 Erethizon
 †Erethizon dorsatum
 Eurytellina
 †Eurytellina linifera
 †Eurytellina spillmani

F

 Fusimitra
 †Fusimitra millingtoni

G

  Galeocerdo
 †Galeocerdo latidens
 Galeodea
 †Galeodea petersoni
 Galeorhinus
 Geomys
 †Geomys bursarius
 Ginglymostoma
 †Ginglymostoma serra

H

  Hemipristis
 †Hemipristis curvatus
 Hemisinus
 †Hemisinus jacksonius
 †Hercoglossa
 †Hercoglossa ulrichi
  Hexaplex
 †Hexaplex marksi
 †Hilgardia
 †Hilgardia multilineata

I

  †Iridomyrmex
 †Iridomyrmex mapesi – type locality for species

K

 †Kapalmerella
 †Kapalmerella arenicola
 †Kapalmerella mortoni

L

 †Lacunaria
 Latirus
 †Latirus humilior
  Lepisosteus
 Lepus
  †Lepus alleni
 †Lepus americanus – tentative report
 †Levifusus
 †Levifusus branneri
 †Linthia
 †Linthia alabamensis
 †Lirodiscus
 †Lirodiscus jacksonensis
 †Litorhadia – tentative report
 †Litorhadia albirupina
 Lynx
  †Lynx rufus

M

 †Mammuthus
  †Mammuthus columbi
 Marmota
 †Marmota monax
 †Mazzalina
 †Mazzalina inaurata
 Mephitis
 †Mephitis mephitis
 Mesalia
 †Mesalia alabamiensis
 †Mesalia pumila
 †Mesalia vetusta
 Microtus
 †Microtus llanensis
 †Microtus paroperarius
  †Miracinonyx
 †Miracinonyx studeri
 Mustela
 †Mustela richardsonii
  Myliobatis
  †Mylohyus
 †Mylohyus fossilis
 Myotis
 †Myotis leibi
 Myrtea
 †Myrtea curta
 Mytilus
 †Mytilus hamatoides

N

 Nassarius
 †Nassarius albirupina
 †Nassarius hilli
  Neotoma
 †Neotoma ozarkensis
 Neogale
†Neogale frenata
 †Neogale vison
Nucula
 †Nucula magnifica

O

 Odocoileus
  †Odocoileus virginianus
  Ondatra
 †Ondatra annectens
 Orthoyoldia
 †Orthoyoldia psammotaea
 †Orthoyoldia rubamnis
 Ostrea
 †Ostrea crenulimarginata
 †Ostrea pulaskensis
 †Otiorhynchites
 †Otiorhynchites wilcoxianus – type locality for species

P

 †Pachecoa
 †Pachecoa corvamnis
 Panthera
  †Panthera onca
 †Pantolestes – or unidentified comparable form
 †Pantolestes natans
 †Papillina
 †Papillina dumosa
 Pekania
 †Pekania diluviana
 Periploma
 †Periploma collardi
 Peromyscus
 Pitar
 †Pitar securiformis
 †Pitar trigoniata
 Pituophis
 Pitymys
 †Pitymys cumberlandensis
 Pleuromeris
 †Pleuromeris parva
 Polinices
 †Polinices eminulus
 †Polinices weisbordi
 †Priscoficus
  Pristis
 Procyon
  †Procyon lotor
  Propeamussium
 †Propeamussium alabamense
 †Propristis
 †Propristis schweinfurthi
 †Protocardia – report made of unidentified related form or using admittedly obsolete nomenclature
 †Protrechina – type locality for genus
 †Protrechina carpenteri – type locality for species
 Pseudoliva
 †Pseudoliva vetusta
 †Pterosphenus
 †Pterosphenus schucherti

R

  Reithrodontomys
 Retusa
 †Retusa jacksonensis
 †Ringicardium
 †Ringicardium harrisi

S

 Scalopus
 †Scalopus aquaticus
 †Sinistrella
 †Sinistrella americana
  †Smilodon
 †Smilodon fatalis
 Sorex
 †Sorex cinereus
 †Sorex fumeus
 †Sorex minutus
 †Sorex monticolus
 Spermophilus
 †Spermophilus tridecemlineatus – tentative report
  Sphyraena
 Spilogale
 †Spilogale putorius – tentative report
 Spisula
 †Spisula albirupina
 Sylvilagus
 †Sylvilagus floridanus – tentative report

T

 Tamiasciurus
  †Tamiasciurus hudsonicus
 Terebra
 †Terebra jacksonensis
 Teredo
  Trichiurus
 †Tritonatractus
 †Tritonatractus pearlensis
 Turritella
 †Turritella clevelandia

U

 Urocyon
  †Urocyon cinereoargenteus
 Ursus
  †Ursus americanus

V

 Venericardia
 †Venericardia diversidentata
 †Venericardia klimacodes
 †Venericardia planicosta
 †Venericardia praecisa
 Vulpes

Y

 Yoldia
 †Yoldia mater

References
 

Cenozoic
Arkansas